Ido Bachelet is an Israeli scientist.

Education
Bachelet earned his Ph.D. in medical sciences from the Hebrew University in Jerusalem, and did two postdoctoral fellowships, engineering at M.I.T. and biologically-inspired engineering at the George Church lab at Harvard University. His fields of expertise include DNA origami, synthetic biology, and biomimetics. He taught life sciences at Bar-Ilan University and industrial design at the Bezalel Academy of Arts and Design in Jerusalem. His research on the bio-inspired architecture was selected to represent Israel at the 16th Biennale of Architecture in Venice.

Research
Bachelet is known for his contribution to the fields of DNA origami, Nanotechnology, and Nanorobotics. His well cited paper "A logic-gated nanorobot for targeted transport of molecular payloads", which deals with nanoscale robots' ability to kill cancer cells, created an important interface between the field of DNA origami and medicine.

Personal life
Bachelet lives in Tel-Aviv. His cousin, Michelle Bachelet, was the president of Chile.

References

External links
 Google's Solve For X 2014
 Dr. Ido Bachelet, TED 2013, How NanoBots will change medicine
 DNA robot could kill cancer cells, on "Nature" website
 DNA nanobots coming to your bloodstream
 איך הפך הסרטן ליצירה מוזיקלית?

Living people
Hebrew University of Jerusalem alumni
Harvard University alumni
Year of birth missing (living people)